José M. Baeza was a Cuban outfielder in the Negro leagues and the Cuban League between 1899 and 1901.

Baeza played for the All Cubans in 1899. He went on to play in the Cuban League in 1900 and 1901.

References

External links
Baseball statistics and player information from Baseball-Reference and Seamheads

Year of birth missing
Year of death missing
Place of birth missing
Place of death missing
All Cubans players
Baseball outfielders
Cuban baseball players